Deoxycortisol may refer to:

 11-Deoxycortisol (cortodoxone, cortexolone, Reichstein's Substance; 17α,21-dihydroxyprogesterone)
 17-Deoxycortisol (corticosterone; 11β,21-dihydroxyprogesterone)
 21-Deoxycortisol (11β,17α-dihydroxyprogesterone)

See also
 Cortisol (hydrocortisone)
 Deoxycorticosterone
 Deoxycortisone

Pregnanes